Mesophellia is a genus of truffle-like fungi in the Mesophelliaceae family. The genus contains about 15 species that are found in Australia. Mesophellia was circumscribed by Miles Joseph Berkeley in 1857.

Species
 Mesophellia angustispora
 Mesophellia arenaria
 Mesophellia brevispora
 Mesophellia castanea
 Mesophellia clelandii
 Mesophellia glareoides
 Mesophellia glauca
 Mesophellia labyrinthina
 Mesophellia oleifera
 Mesophellia pallidospora
 Mesophellia parva
 Mesophellia parvispora
 Mesophellia rava
 Mesophellia rodwayi
 Mesophellia sabulosa
 Mesophellia trabalis
 Mesophellia tropica
 Mesophellia westresii

References

External links
 

Hysterangiales
Truffles (fungi)
Agaricomycetes genera